Ilisha is a genus of ray-finned fishes in the family Pristigasteridae. The genus contains 16 species. It is similar to Pellona but lacks a toothed hypo-maxilla. The genus has a worldwide distribution in tropical and subtropical coastal waters and estuaries. Some species also enter rivers, and I. amazonica and I. novacula are largely–if not entirely–restricted to tropical rivers.

Fisheries
Two Ilisha species are individually reported in the FAO catch statistics: Ilisha elongata off coasts of China and Korea and Ilisha africana off West African coasts. Other species may be reported as simply clupeoids.

Species
There are currently 16 recognized species in this genus:
 Ilisha africana (Bloch, 1795) (West African ilisha)
 Ilisha amazonica (A. Miranda-Ribeiro, 1920) (Amazon ilisha)
 Ilisha compressa J. E. Randall, 1994
 Ilisha elongata (Anonymous (referred to E. T. Bennett), 1830) (Elongate ilisha)
 Ilisha filigera (Valenciennes, 1847) (Coromandel ilisha)
 Ilisha fuerthii (Steindachner, 1875) (Pacific ilisha)
 Ilisha kampeni (M. C. W. Weber & de Beaufort, 1913) (Kampen's ilisha)
 Ilisha lunula Kailola, 1986 (Longtail ilisha)
 Ilisha macrogaster Bleeker, 1866 (Kalimantan ilisha)
 Ilisha megaloptera (Swainson, 1839) (Bigeye ilisha)
 Ilisha melastoma (Bloch & J. G. Schneider, 1801) (Indian ilisha)
 Ilisha novacula (Valenciennes, 1847) (Burmese River ilisha)
 Ilisha obfuscata Wongratana, 1983 (Hidden ilisha)
 Ilisha pristigastroides (Bleeker, 1852) (Javan ilisha)
 Ilisha sirishai Seshagiri Rao, 1975 (Lobejaw ilisha)
 Ilisha striatula Wongratana, 1983 (Banded ilisha)

References

External links
 

Pristigasteridae
Ray-finned fish genera
Taxa named by John Richardson (naturalist)